The men's 110 metres hurdles event at the 2015 European Athletics U23 Championships was held in Tallinn, Estonia, at Kadriorg Stadium on 10 and 11 July.

Medalists

Results

Final
11 July
Wind: -1.5 m/s

Heats
10 July

Heat 1
Wind: -0.2 m/s

Heat 2
Wind: -0.9 m/s

Participation
According to an unofficial count, 16 athletes from 11 countries participated in the event.

References

110 metres hurdles
Sprint hurdles at the European Athletics U23 Championships